William John Molloy (1884–1965) was an Irish politician. He was an independent member of Seanad Éireann from 1922 to 1931. He was elected at the 1922 Seanad election for 9 years, and lost his seat in the 1931 Seanad election.

Molloy left the U.S. in 1920 and lived in Carrowroe Park in Roscommon.

Wiliam John was the father of Father Niall Molloy, who was murdered in Clara, County Offaly, Ireland in July 1985.

References

1965 deaths
Independent members of Seanad Éireann
Members of the 1922 Seanad
Members of the 1925 Seanad
Members of the 1928 Seanad
Irish farmers
1884 births